The Diablo Grande AVA is an American Viticultural Area located in Stanislaus County, California.  All 
 in the AVA are owned by the Diablo Grande Resort Community, and Isom Ranch Winery is the only winery producing wines that carry the Diablo Grande AVA designation on their labels. The region is named after nearby Mount Diablo, the highest peak in the Pacific Coast Range.

References 

American Viticultural Areas
American Viticultural Areas of California
Geography of Stanislaus County, California
1998 establishments in California